Xiping County is a county in the southeast-central part of Henan province in the People's Republic of China. It is the northernmost county-level division of the prefecture-level city of Zhumadian.

The place of the iron forge of Jiudian from the Warring States period until the Jin dynasty and the pagoda of the Baoyan temple from the Tang dynasty are listed in the list of Monuments of the People's Republic of China.

Administration 
It administers 3 sub-district offices, 6 towns, 9 townships, 1 ethnic township and 2 others.

Subdistricts
Baicheng Subdistrict
Baiting Subdistrict
Baiyuan Subdistrict

Towns

Townships

Ethnic townships
Caizhai Hui Ethnic Township

Others
Laowangpo Farm
Industrial Cluster Area

Climate

References

External links
 China Cultural Heritage (Chinese)
 Jiudian yetie yizhi (Chinese)
 Baoyan si ta (Chinese)

County-level divisions of Henan
Zhumadian